Mehdi Hosseini (born 11 March 1990 in Tehran) is an Iranian actor.

Biography
Mehdi Hosseini is an Iranian actor and writer who started his career in 2010 on Iranian television. He is the main actor of the short film Are You Volleyball, which is one of the most honorable short film in the history of Iranian cinema and has participated in 404 international festivals. He‌ has also the main role in the film One Night in Tehran, for which he won awards at prestigious international festivals.

Filmography

Film

Television

References

External links
 

Living people
1990 births
Iranian male film actors
Iranian male television actors